Hayat Music TV is a music television channel from Hayat TV that broadcasting music videos available via cable systems in Bosnia and Herzegovina and former Yugoslavia.

Programming
Programming is in the Bosnian language including Bosnian music and foreign and international music.
 A PLAYLISTA - (A playlist) current and latest home videos from Bosnia and Herzegovina
 B PLAYLISTA - (B playlist) current and latest international music video clips
 10 NAJBOLJIH - (Top 10) top list of current domestic and foreign videos
 SAMO HITOVI - (Hits only)
 NOVO! - (NEW!) - the latest premiere music videos
 10 NAJBOLJIH ŽENSKIH VOKALA - (Top 10 female vocalists) - list of the top 10 female vocalists
 10 NAJBOLJIH MUŠKIH VOKALA - (Top 10 male vocalists) - list of the top 10 male vocalists
 JA VOLIM OSAMDESETE - (I LOVE 1980s)
 JA VOLIM DEVETDESETE - (I LOVE 1990s)
 JA VOLIM BALADE - (Love songs) list of emotional love songs
 JA VOLIM OLDIES GOLDIES - popular music of various musical styles

References

External links 
 

Mass media in Sarajevo
Music organizations based in Bosnia and Herzegovina
Music television channels
Television stations in Bosnia and Herzegovina
Television channels in North Macedonia
Television channels and stations established in 2012